"Home to You" is a song written by Arlos Smith and Sara Light, and recorded by American country music artist John Michael Montgomery. It was released in July 1999 as the second single and title track from the album Home to You.  The song reached No. 2 on the Billboard Hot Country Singles & Tracks chart.

Music video
The music video was directed by Jim Shea and premiered in late 1999.

Chart performance
"Home to You" debuted at number sixty-two on the U.S. Billboard Hot Country Singles & Tracks for the week of July 17, 1999.

Year-end charts

References

1999 singles
John Michael Montgomery songs
Song recordings produced by Garth Fundis
Atlantic Records singles
1999 songs